Kwang-hoon is a Korean male given name.

People with this name include:
 Jeon Kwang-hoon (born 1956), South Korean pastor and politician
Kim Kwang-Hoon (born 1982), South Korean weightlifter
Kim Kwang-Hoon (footballer) (born 1961), South Korean footballer
Lee Gwang-Hoon (born 1993), South Korean footballer
Lee Kwang-hoon (born 1959), South Korean film director
Shin Kwang-Hoon (born 1987), South Korean footballer

See also
List of Korean given names

Korean masculine given names